Eddie Dix (born 31 December 1970 in Schiedam) is a Dutch baseball player who represented the Netherlands at the 1996 Summer Olympics.

References

Dutch baseball players
Olympic baseball players of the Netherlands
Baseball players at the 1996 Summer Olympics
Sportspeople from Schiedam
1970 births
Living people